Doru Adrian Dumitrescu (born 25 May 1998) is a Romanian former professional footballer who played as a midfielder for Viitorul Constanța and Universitatea Cluj. He decided to end his career in April 2021 at age 23 because of injuries. He played his last official match, for U Cluj, in 2019.

Honours
Viitorul Constanța
Liga I: 2016–17

References

External links
 
 

1998 births
Living people
Romanian footballers
Romania under-21 international footballers
Liga I players
FC Viitorul Constanța players
Liga II players
FC Universitatea Cluj players
Association football midfielders